Samos is a Greek island in the eastern Aegean Sea.

Samos may also refer to:

In geography:

 Samos (theme), a military-civilian province of the Byzantine Empire
 Samos Prefecture, a former administrative unit of Greece 
 Samos Province, a former administrative unit of Greece
 Samos (town), a port town on the island of Samos
 Vathy, Samos, the capital of the island of Samos
 Principality of Samos
 Samos International Airport, on the island of Samos
 Samicum, an ancient city in Triphylia, Greece
 Samos, Galicia, a village in Spain 
 Samos, Lugo, the municipality around the village of Samos, Spain
 Samoš, a village in Serbia
 Samos, Missouri, a community in the United States

In fiction

 Samos, a fictional character in the Jak and Daxter game series
 Samos, First Slaver of Port Kar, a fictional character in the Gor series of novels

In other uses:
Samos (satellite), an American surveillance satellite
, several ships of the Hellenic Navy

See also
 Same, legendary island in the Ionian Sea, near Ithaca
 Samus (disambiguation)